Pedro Camus Pérez (born 13 June 1955) is a Spanish retired footballer. He competed in the men's tournament at the 1976 Summer Olympics.

References

External links

1955 births
Living people
Spanish footballers
Olympic footballers of Spain
Footballers at the 1976 Summer Olympics
Footballers from Santander, Spain
Racing de Santander players
Real Zaragoza players
CD Tenerife players
La Liga players
Segunda División players
Association football defenders